Hot Toys Limited is a Hong Kong production house for designing, developing, and manufacturing highly detailed collectible merchandise to worldwide markets. Established in 2000 in Hong Kong (with its current headquarters in Kwun Tong District), the company initially focused on producing 1:6 scale US Army Special Forces action figures. It then transitioned to production of high-end figures based on media properties, primarily under their Movie Masterpiece Series brand. Their team of artists is led by sculptor Yulli and painter JC Hong.

In 2010, Hot Toys’ one and only official store, Toy Hunters, was recognized as one of the 50 best independent shops in Hong Kong by "Time Out" Magazine.

Licensed properties

Films

 300
 Alien film series
 Alien vs. Predator film series
 Alita: Battle Angel
 Ant-Man
 Ant-Man and the Wasp
 Aquaman
 Astro Boy
 Avatar
 Avatar: The Way of Water
 The Avengers
 Avengers: Age of Ultron
 Avengers: Infinity War
 Avengers: Endgame
 The Amazing Spider-Man
 The Amazing Spider-Man 2
 Back to the Future
 Batman
 Batman Returns
 Batman Begins
 Batman v Superman: Dawn of Justice
 The Batman
 Beauty and the Beast
 Birds of Prey
 Black Adam
 Black Panther
 Black Panther: Wakanda Forever
 Black Widow
 Blade trilogy
 Captain America: The First Avenger
 Captain America: The Winter Soldier
 Captain America: Civil War
 Captain Marvel
 Clash of the Titans
 Commando
 The Crow
 The Dark Knight
 The Dark Knight Rises
 Deadpool
 Deadpool 2
 Doctor Strange
 Doctor Strange in the Multiverse of Madness
 Edward Scissorhands
 Eternals
 The Expendables
 G.I. Joe: Retaliation
 The Godfather
 Goemon
 Green Lantern
 Guardians of the Galaxy
 Guardians of the Galaxy Vol. 2
 Hellboy II: The Golden Army
 Indiana Jones
 Inglourious Basterds
 Iron Man
 Iron Man 2
 Iron Man 3
 Justice League
 Kamui Gaiden
 Maleficent
 Man of Steel
 Mars Attacks!
 The Matrix
 The Matrix Resurrections
 Morbius
 Pirates of the Caribbean film series
 Planet of the Apes
 Platoon
 Predator film series
 Prince of Persia: The Sands of Time
 Rambo film series
 Rango (2011 film)
 Resident Evil film series
 RoboCop film series
 Rocky film series
 Shang-Chi and the Legend of the Ten Rings
 Space Pirate Captain Harlock
 The Spirit
 Spider-Man 3
 Spider-Man: Homecoming
 Spider-Man: Far From Home
 Spider-Man: No Way Home
 Spider-Man: Into the Spider-Verse
 Sucker Punch
 Suicide Squad
 The Suicide Squad
 Superman
 Superman Returns
 Star Wars
 Terminator film series
 The Warlords
 The Wolverine
 Thor
 Thor: The Dark World
 Thor: Ragnarok
 Thor: Love and Thunder
 Tron: Legacy
 Venom
 Venom: Let There Be Carnage
 Warriors of Future
 Wonder Woman
 Wonder Woman 1984
 X-Men: The Last Stand
 X-Men Origins: Wolverine
 X-Men: First Class 
 X-Men: Days of Future Past
 Zack Snyder's Justice League

TV Series
 Agents of S.H.I.E.L.D.
 Batman
 The Book of Boba Fett
 Daredevil
 The Falcon and the Winter Soldier
 The Flash
 Hawkeye
 Loki
 The Mandalorian
 Moon Knight
 Obi-Wan Kenobi
 Peacemaker
 Prison Break
 She-Hulk: Attorney at Law
 WandaVision
 What If...?

Cartoons
 Disney Characters

Video Games
 Batman: Arkham game series
 Resident Evil game series
 Assassin's Creed
 Metal Gear Solid
 Spider-Man
 ''Spider-Man: Miles Morales

Anime/Manga
 Appleseed Ex Machina
 Astro Boy
 Battle Royale II
 Black Jack
 City Hunter
 Mobile Suit Gundam - Char Aznable

Comic Masterpiece Series
 Friend
 City Hunter

Celebrities

 Christian Bale
 Marlon Brando
 James Dean
 Michael Jackson
 Leslie Cheung
 Namson Lau
 Wong Ka Kui
 50 Cent
 Bruce Lee
 Stan Lee
 Kevin Feige
 Eminem
 Snoop Dogg
 Al Pacino

In popular culture
Hot Toys action figures have been used in stop motion videos, specifically by Patrick Boivin and Hong Kong based movie director Derek Kwok.

See also
 Funko

References

External links
 

Action figures
Toy brands
Model manufacturers of China
Toy companies established in 2000
Toy companies of Hong Kong